Hambleton Hall is an historic building in Hambleton, Lancashire, England. Built in 1710, it is a house in pebbledashed brick with a slate roof, in two storeys and three bays.  There is a continuous rendered string course between the storeys.  The windows are modern and have plain reveals.  Above the doorway is an inscribed plaque.

See also
Listed buildings in Hambleton, Lancashire

References

Sources

1710 establishments in England
Houses completed in 1710
Grade II listed buildings in Lancashire
Houses in Lancashire
Farmhouses in England
Buildings and structures in the Borough of Wyre
Hall